The 1998–99 NBA season was the tenth season for the Orlando Magic in the National Basketball Association. On March 23, 1998, the owners of all 29 NBA teams voted 27–2 to reopen the league's collective bargaining agreement, seeking changes to the league's salary cap system, and a ceiling on individual player salaries. The National Basketball Players Association (NBPA) opposed to the owners' plan, and wanted raises for players who earned the league's minimum salary. After both sides failed to reach an agreement, the owners called for a lockout, which began on July 1, 1998, putting a hold on all team trades, free agent signings and training camp workouts, and cancelling many NBA regular season and preseason games. Due to the lockout, the NBA All-Star Game, which was scheduled to be played in Philadelphia on February 14, 1999, was also cancelled. However, on January 6, 1999, NBA commissioner David Stern, and NBPA director Billy Hunter finally reached an agreement to end the lockout. The deal was approved by both the players and owners, and was signed on January 20, ending the lockout after 204 days. The regular season began on February 5, and was cut short to just 50 games instead of the regular 82-game schedule.

During the off-season, the Magic signed free agents Isaac Austin, and former All-Star forward Dominique Wilkins, who previously played in Italy, and would become teammates with his younger brother Gerald Wilkins. At midseason, the team signed free agent B.J. Armstrong, who was previously released by the Los Angeles Lakers. The Magic played solid basketball winning 14 of their first 18 games, then won their final four games, and finished second in the Atlantic Division with a 33–17 record, returning to the playoffs as the #3 seed in the Eastern Conference after a one-year absence.

After missing most of the previous season with a knee injury, Penny Hardaway played all 50 games, but his scoring had decreased as he averaged 15.8 points, 5.3 assists and 2.2 steals per game. In addition, Nick Anderson provided the team with 14.9 points, 5.9 rebounds and 1.4 steals per game, while Darrell Armstrong had a breakout season averaging 13.8 points, 6.7 assists and 2.2 steals per game, while winning both the Sixth Man and Most Improved Player of the Year awards. Austin averaged 9.7 points and 4.8 rebounds per game, while Horace Grant provided with 8.9 points and 7.0 rebounds per game, first round draft pick Matt Harpring contributed 8.2 points and 4.3 rebounds per game, and Bo Outlaw averaged 6.5 points, 5.4 rebounds, 1.3 steals and 1.4 blocks per game, but only played 31 games due to a leg injury. Harpring was named to the NBA All-Rookie First Team, while top draft pick Michael Doleac was selected to the NBA All-Rookie Second Team.

However, in the Eastern Conference First Round of the playoffs, the Magic lost to the 6th–seeded Philadelphia 76ers in four games. Following the season, head coach Chuck Daly retired, while Hardaway was traded to the Phoenix Suns after six seasons in Orlando, Anderson, the only member left from the team's inaugural season, was traded to the Sacramento Kings after ten seasons in Orlando, Grant was dealt to the Seattle SuperSonics, Austin was sent to the Washington Wizards, and B.J. Armstrong re-signed as a free agent with his former team, the Chicago Bulls. Both of the Wilkins' brothers and veteran center Danny Schayes all retired.

For the season, the Magic changed their uniforms replacing the pinstripes with visible stars, and side panels on their jerseys and shorts, which remained in use until 2003.

Draft picks

Roster

Regular season

Season standings

z – clinched division title
y – clinched division title
x – clinched playoff spot

Record vs. opponents

Game log

Playoffs

|- align="center" bgcolor="#ffcccc"
| 1
| May 9
| Philadelphia
| L 90–104
| Penny Hardaway (19)
| Horace Grant (10)
| Armstrong, Hardaway (6)
| Orlando Arena15,267
| 0–1
|- align="center" bgcolor="#ccffcc"
| 2
| May 11
| Philadelphia
| W 79–68
| Penny Hardaway (22)
| Nick Anderson (8)
| three players tied (4)
| Orlando Arena16,345
| 1–1
|- align="center" bgcolor="#ffcccc"
| 3
| May 13
| @ Philadelphia
| L 85–97
| Nick Anderson (23)
| Matt Harpring (10)
| Darrell Armstrong (7)
| First Union Center20,874
| 1–2
|- align="center" bgcolor="#ffcccc"
| 4
| May 15
| @ Philadelphia
| L 91–101
| Nick Anderson (29)
| Austin, Grant (8)
| Darrell Armstrong (8)
| First Union Center20,550
| 1–3
|-

Player statistics

Season

Playoffs

NOTE: Please write the players statistics in alphabetical order by last name.

Awards and records
Darrell Armstrong – Sixth Man of the Year, Most Improved Player
Matt Harpring – All-Rookie 1st team
Michael Doleac – All-Rookie 2nd team

Transactions

References

Orlando Magic seasons
1998 in sports in Florida
1999 in sports in Florida